Salvador Bru is a painter, born in Valencia, Spain. His work has been exhibited throughout the United States, and Europe.

Biography
Bru's parents encouraged him to pursue a stable career, however Bru studied at the Academy of San Carlos and post-graduation, he began working for the J. Walter Thompson advertising agency (JWT).  Seeking independence, he freelanced from Barcelona, Spain from 1978 to 1980, before moving to New York City. Here, he accepted work with NBC, and two advertising agencies.
He has been regularly commissioned to illustrate for the Washingtonian magazine, corporations including Mobil, the United States Government, and newspapers such as The Washington Post, The Baltimore Sun, The Boston Globe and The New York Times. He has also taught art classes at the University of Barcelona.

References
Vintage Bru: Gomez Showcases a Modern-day Master of "l'Art Informel" | Baltimore City Paper Oldham, Ned, 14 November 2001. (Retrieved 2 March 2011.)

Salvador Bru - Calm mood prevails in Salvador Bru's work - Baltimore Sun Mike Giuliano, March 14, 1991. (Retrieved 2 March 2011.)

Hope Gibbs: Salvador Bru: Illustrator in profile [HalfBleed magazine] Hope Gibbs, September 1999. (Retrieved 2 March 2011.)

Living people
20th-century Spanish painters
20th-century Spanish male artists
Spanish male painters
21st-century Spanish painters
Year of birth missing (living people)
21st-century Spanish male artists